Oncieu is a commune in the Ain department and the Auvergne-Rhône-Alpes region in eastern France. Residents of Oncieu are called Onciolans

Geography
The river Albarine forms most of the commune's southern border.

Population

See also
Communes of the Ain department

References

Communes of Ain
Ain communes articles needing translation from French Wikipedia